Nicholas J. LaRocca (October 4, 1913 – August 30, 1999) was an American Democratic Party politician who served in both houses of the New Jersey Legislature from the 33rd district. He served a partial term in the New Jersey Senate succeeding his mentor William Musto and then a single term in the New Jersey General Assembly.

LaRocca was born in 1913 in Union City where he attended the local public schools. He graduated from Fordham College in 1934 and received a law degree from New York University in 1937.

He worked as a legislative aide for State Senator (and Union City Mayor) William Musto at the time of Musto's removal from the Senate for his conviction on receiving kickbacks from a developer. LaRocca was essentially handpicked by Musto to be the Democratic nominee for the special election to fill the remaining 1.5 years of the Senate term. In his first bid for elected office, LaRocca defeated independent Libero Marotta, Republican Dennis Teti, and independent Carlos Munoz in a June 23, 1982 special election. In the next regular election in 1983, LaRocca and then-Assemblyman Christopher Jackman switched seats where Jackman ran for Senate and LaRocca ran for Assembly. Both won their respective races. After serving alongside Robert Ranieri for one term from the 33rd district, LaRocca did not seek reelection in 1985.

He died on August 30, 1999 aged 85.

References

1913 births
1999 deaths
Fordham University alumni
New York University alumni
New Jersey lawyers
Politicians from Union City, New Jersey
Democratic Party New Jersey state senators
Democratic Party members of the New Jersey General Assembly
20th-century American politicians
20th-century American lawyers
People from Union City, New Jersey